Thomas Irwin (February 22, 1785 – May 14, 1870) was a United States representative from Pennsylvania and a United States district judge of the United States District Court for the Western District of Pennsylvania.

Education and career

Born on February 22, 1785, in Philadelphia, Pennsylvania, Irwin attended the common schools, Franklin College (now Franklin & Marshall College) in Lancaster, Pennsylvania and read law in 1808. He was editor of the Philadelphia Repository starting in 1804. He was admitted to the bar and entered private practice in Uniontown, Pennsylvania in 1808, and from 1811 to 1812. He was an Indian agent in Natchitoches, Louisiana from 1808 to 1810, also practicing law at that location. He was deputy attorney general for Fayette County, Pennsylvania from 1812 to 1819. He was a member of the Pennsylvania House of Representatives from Fayette County from 1824 to 1828.

Congressional service

Irwin was elected as a Jacksonian Democrat from Pennsylvania's 14th congressional district to the United States House of Representatives of the 21st United States Congress, serving from March 4, 1829, to March 3, 1831. He was not a candidate for renomination in 1830.

Federal judicial service

Irwin received a recess appointment from President Andrew Jackson on April 14, 1831, to a seat on the United States District Court for the Western District of Pennsylvania vacated by Judge William Wilkins. He was nominated to the same position by President Jackson on December 7, 1831. He was confirmed by the United States Senate on March 21, 1832, and received his commission the same day. His service terminated on January 4, 1859, due to his resignation.

Circumstances of his resignation

On January 13, 1859, the United States House of Representatives authorized the United States House Committee on the Judiciary to investigate charges against Irwin. On January 28, 1859, the House discontinued proceedings on the report that Irwin had resigned. At least 3 different attempts were made by Pittsburgh Bar to secure Irwin's impeachment. Irwin had been charged with partiality toward certain lawyers, with holding needless terms of court and with demanding that the United States Marshal for the Western District of Pennsylvania kick-back a portion of his salary and fees to the Judge. Irwin was also detested by the anti-slavery bar of Western Pennsylvania for the maintenance of the constitutionality of the Fugitive Slave Act of 1850. In the face of almost certain impeachment, Irwin resigned.

Later career and death

Following his resignation from the federal bench, Irwin resumed private practice in Pittsburgh, Pennsylvania from 1859 to 1870. He died on May 14, 1870, in Pittsburgh. He was interred in Allegheny Cemetery in Pittsburgh.

References

Sources

External links
 

Members of the Pennsylvania House of Representatives
Pennsylvania lawyers
Louisiana lawyers
Judges of the United States District Court for the Western District of Pennsylvania
United States federal judges appointed by Andrew Jackson
19th-century American judges
Politicians from Pittsburgh
1785 births
1870 deaths
Jacksonian members of the United States House of Representatives from Pennsylvania
Burials at Allegheny Cemetery
19th-century American politicians
United States federal judges admitted to the practice of law by reading law